Stevan Gligorijević (born March 8, 1997) is a Macedonian/Serbian professional basketball Power forward who currently plays for Prievidza in the Slovak Basketball League (SBL).

References

External links
 Second ABA League Profile

1997 births
Living people
Macedonian people of Serbian descent
Macedonian men's basketball players
Serbian expatriate basketball people in North Macedonia
Serbian men's basketball players
Power forwards (basketball)
People from Bor, Serbia